Lake Kamnarok is a seasonal lake and the only ex-bow lake in Kenya, at the base of the Kerio Valley. The name originated from the Kalenjin word Narok, which is  used to refer to a species of water plant that was widely found in the lake. Thick mash surrounds the lake, making accessibility challenging. 

The lake occupies an area of approximately 1 km2 however being a seasonal lake, the size may at times be much smaller. It was in existence before 1961 but the flood rains of that year led to its enlargement. The flooding disaster saw people living in the area being evacuated in order to save lives. Helicopters were used during the evacuation exercise to airlift people to the higher ground of Maab Konga - a hill near Muchukwo trading centre.

The lake was gazetted in 1984, when Lake Kamnarok Game Reserve was created.  This is the home of 500 elephants.

Like other Great Rift Valley lakes, its existence is threatened, mainly because of farming activities in the area. There are deep gullies that are likely to lead to spilling of the water, thus joining it with the Kerio River. A few measures have been taken to save the lake, including the building of gabions. The tributaries that feed Lake Kamnarok include the rivers Ketipborok, Cheplogoi, Oiwo and Lelabei.

References 

Lakes of the Great Rift Valley
Lakes of Kenya
Oxbow lakes